Cha In-ha (July 15, 1992 – December 3, 2019) was a South Korean actor best known for starring in The Banker, Clean with Passion for Now, and Love with Flaws. He was a member of the actor group Surprise U.

Biography
Cha In-ha was born Lee Jae-ho on July 15, 1992, in Sinchon. In 2017, he started his acting career as one of five members of Surprise U. He also starred in Deep Inside of Me. He played Hwang Jae Min in Clean with Passion for Now. He appeared in the You, Deep Inside of Me short film. He also appeared in Are You Human? and Temperature of Love. At the time of his death, he was playing Joo Won-seok in Love with Flaws.

Death
Cha died on December 3, 2019, of undisclosed causes. He was found dead in his house in the Gangnam District of Seoul by his manager. Cha's agency, Fantagio, has advised against spreading "rumors [and] speculative reports" involving his death out of respect for his family, and they have stated that he would have a private funeral. A police spokesman stated that Cha left "no will or final message", and that his family has requested an autopsy not be conducted.

The New York Times, The Guardian, and Deadline Hollywood have made comparisons of his death to those of Sulli and Goo Hara, both of whom died young within two months of his death. Korea Times reported that concerns over copycat suicides have been raised.

Filmography

Television series

References

External links

1992 births
2019 deaths
21st-century South Korean male actors
Deaths in South Korea
K-pop singers
Male actors from Seoul
Singers from Seoul
South Korean male pop singers